Al Nahda is a locality in Dubai, United Arab Emirates (UAE). Located in eastern Dubai in Deira, Al Nahda forms part of Dubai's eastern border with the emirate of Sharjah. Portions of Al Nahda that flow north into the emirate of Sharjah fall within that emirate's jurisdiction.

Al Nahda, literally meaning The Awakening, is bordered to the south and east by Al Qusais, and to the west by Al Mamzar. It is bounded to the north by route E 11 (Al Ittihad Road) and to the south by a local road (204 Road). Al Nahda comprises two subcommunities — Al Nahda 1 and Al Nahda 2.

Like Muhaisnah, the community was originally carved out of the industrial areas of Al Qusais, but it has undergone extensive and mostly residential development in recent years.  Landmarks include Dubai Women's College, Al Nahda Pond Park, Al Diyafah High School, Expo Centre Sharjah, Sahara Centre (the largest Mall in the Emirates of Sharjah), the Khalid Lake, Al Majaz Island, and the Mamzar Beach Park.

Education
Educational institutions situated in Al Nahda include:

 Al Diyafah High School
 The Central School
 Dubai Carmel School
 Future Target Institute 
 Jaraso Education Institute
 The Millennium School
 MSB Private School
 Pristine Private School
 Pristine Rainbow Nursery
 Sahara Education Institute
 The Sheffield Private School

See also
 Al Nahda (Dubai Metro)

References

Communities in Dubai